Hamza Ould Jawar (born 11 July 1995) is a Mauritanian professional footballer who plays as a defender for Régional 1 club Mondeville and the Mauritania national team.

International career
Jawar made his debut for Mauritania in a match on 29 March 2016 against the Gambia.

Career statistics

References

External links 
 
 

1995 births
Living people
Mauritanian footballers
Mauritania international footballers
Association football defenders
Mauritanian expatriate footballers
Mauritanian expatriate sportspeople in France
Expatriate footballers in France
Championnat National 3 players
Championnat National 2 players
Régional 1 players
Stade Malherbe Caen players
USON Mondeville players